Cape Schlossbach is a headland forming the eastern end of the Prehn Peninsula, located between Hansen and Gardner inlets on the eastern side of the base of the Antarctic Peninsula.  The cape was discovered by Finn Ronne in 1940 or/and 1947–48, who named it for Cdr. Isaac Schlossbach, second-in-command of the expedition and commander of the ship Port of Beaumont in Texas.

References

Headlands of Palmer Land